Hierodula schultzei is a species of praying mantis in the family Mantidae.

Subspecies
These two subspecies belong to the species Hierodula schultzei:
 Hierodula schultzei brevis Giglio-Tos, 1912
 Hierodula schultzei schultzei Giglio-Tos, 1912

References

schultzei
Articles created by Qbugbot
Insects described in 1912